Harry Palmer is the name given to a fictional intelligence officer in a number of films based on based on the books of Len Deighton, in which he is unnamed

Harry Palmer may also refer to:

 Harry Palmer (actor) (c.1889–1962), American vaudeville actor
 Harry Palmer (animator), American animator
 Harry Palmer (photographer) (born 1930), Canadian photographer
 Harry J. Palmer (1872–1948), New York politician
 Harry Palmer, founder of the Avatar Course
 Harry Palmer, the first husband of Olive Diefenbaker
 Harry Palmer, American musician, guitar player with Ford Theatre (band)
 Harry Palmer, American record label executive and uncle of R. Stevie Moore

See also
Henry Palmer (disambiguation)